The 2004 NCAA Division II Men's Lacrosse Championship was the 20th annual tournament to determine the national champions of NCAA Division II men's college lacrosse in the United States.

The final was played at M&T Bank Stadium, the home stadium of the NFL's Baltimore Ravens, in Baltimore, Maryland. The final was held in Baltimore alongside the championship games of the Division I and Division III NCAA men's lacrosse tournaments.

Le Moyne defeated Limestone in the championship game, 11–10 after two overtimes, to claim the Dolphins' first Division II national title.

Bracket

See also
2004 NCAA Division II Women's Lacrosse Championship
2004 NCAA Division I Men's Lacrosse Championship
2004 NCAA Division III Men's Lacrosse Championship

References

NCAA Division II Men's Lacrosse Championship
NCAA Division II Men's Lacrosse Championship
NCAA Division II Men's Lacrosse